Jack Kelvin Paff (born 11 May 1938) is a former Australian politician.

Early life 
Paff was born in Taree, New South Wales. He served in the Citizens Military Force and rose to the position of sergeant. He was a stationmaster with New South Wales Government Railways and then served in the Queensland Police Force.

Politics 
In 1998, Paff was elected to the Legislative Assembly of Queensland as a member of Pauline Hanson's One Nation, representing the seat of Ipswich West. He remained in One Nation until December 1999, when he and the other One Nation MPs left the party to form the City Country Alliance under the leadership of Bill Feldman. Paff continued as party whip for the new grouping, and was the spokesperson for Law (Attorney-General), Justice and the Arts, Communication and Information, Local Government and Planning, Regional and Rural Communities, State Development and Trade. He was defeated in 2001 by Labor's Don Livingstone, whom Paff had defeated in 1998.

In 2017, aged 79 years, Paff unsuccessfully contested the position of Mayor of the City of Ipswich.

References

1938 births
Living people
One Nation members of the Parliament of Queensland
People from New South Wales
Australian police officers
Members of the Queensland Legislative Assembly
21st-century Australian politicians